Michael R. Bell (August 8, 1957 – January 25, 2021) was an American professional motocross and mountain bike racer. He competed in the AMA Motocross Championships from 1976 to 1983. Bell was a member of the Yamaha factory racing team for his entire motocross career, winning the AMA Supercross Championship in 1980. He won twenty AMA and Trans-AMA events during his career.

In 1983 Mike Bell's motocross career ended due to injuries, especially knee problems.

While coming back from knee surgery he took up bicycling to rebuild strength. He went on to be a competitive mountain bike racer.

Bell was inducted into the AMA Hall of Fame in 2001.

Mike Bell died of a heart attack while bicycling near his home.

References

1957 births
2021 deaths
American motocross riders
AMA Motocross Championship National Champions
Motorcycle racers from Los Angeles
American mountain bikers
Cyclists from Los Angeles
Deaths from coronary thrombosis